Carla Simón Pipó (born 22 December 1986) is a Spanish film director. Both her 2017 debut feature Summer 1993 and her second feature, Alcarràs (which won the Golden Bear at the 72nd Berlinale, the first Catalan-language film to do so), were submitted to the Academy of Motion Picture Arts and Sciences to represent Spain for Best International Feature Film at the 90th and 95th Academy Awards, respectively.

Biography
Simón was born 22 December 1986 in Barcelona and spent her youth in the Catalan village of Les Planes d'Hostoles. By the age of six, both her parents died of AIDS so she had to live with her uncle and his family in Garrotxa in northern Catalonia. In 2009, Simón graduated from studying film science at the Universitat Autònoma de Barcelona. In 2010, she studied television work at Televisió de Catalunya and later at the London Film School. During her time in London she directed the documentary film Born Positive and the short film Lipstick. Her youth  experience was the background to her first film  which premiered in 2017. 

Summer 1993 was filmed in 2017, and became Simón's first feature film production. The film is about a young girl and her reaction to and ways of handling her parents' sudden death. The film was produced by Inicia Films y Avalon P.C. and the filming took place over six weeks in rural Garrotxa where Simón grew up.

The film has received plenty of attention at various film festivals where it was shown. It has won over thirty awards, amongst them the award for Debut Film at the Berlin Film Festival. It was also chosen as Spain's submission for Best Foreign Film at the 90th Academy Awards, the second film in Catalan to be submitted to the award ever.

Simón's 2022 film, Alcarràs, won the Golden Bear at the seventy-second edition of the Berlinale, becoming the first Catalan-language film to receive this award.

Filmography

Direction 
2009 – Lovers
2009 – Women
2012 – Born Positive
2013 – Lipstick
2014 – 
2017 – Summer 1993
2018 – Después también
2020 – Correspondencia, co-directed with Dominga Sotomayor
2022 – Alcarràs
2022 – Carta a mi madre para mi hijo

Scriptwriter 
2012 – Born Positive (documentary film) 
2013 – Lipstick (short film)
2017 – Summer 1993, feature film
2018 – Después También (short film), co-scripted with Aina Clotet
2022 – Alcarràs (feature film), co-scripted with Arnau Vilaró

Awards and nominations

References

External links

1986 births
Living people
Film directors from Catalonia
Spanish women film directors
Directors of Golden Bear winners
21st-century Spanish screenwriters